Mathez is a surname. Notable people with the surname include:

Bernard Mathez, Swiss footballer
Cynthia Mathez (born 1985), Swiss para-badminton player
Guy Mathez (born 1946), Swiss football manager

Surnames of Swiss origin